Kalmar County or Region Kalmar held a regional council election on 9 September 2018, on the same day as the general and municipal elections.

Results
The number of seats remained at 67 with the Social Democrats winning the most at 25, a drop of two from 2014. There were 159,333 valid ballots cast.

Municipalities

References

Elections in Kalmar County
Kalmar